Dietmar Beiersdorfer (born 16 November 1963) is a German former football player and coach who works as a director for Hamburger SV. He began a coaching career with Hamburger SV in 2003 and served as sporting director of the Austrian team Red Bull Salzburg between 2010 and April 2011.

Club career 
Born in Fürth, in his youth Beiersdorfer played for TSC Cadolzburg, TSV Altenberg and ASV Herzogenaurach. In 1984, he moved from 1. FC Bamberg to Oberliga team SpVgg Fürth, where he was discovered by scouts of Hamburger SV. Beiersdorfer was soon lured to Hamburg along with his friend Manfred Kastl. Immediately Beiersdorfer was able to gain a place in the first eleven, and he would subsequently help Hamburg to win several matches and the German cup.

By 1992 Beiersdorfer had played 174 games in the Bundesliga, scoring 14 goals. However, because the Hamburg team were struggling financially, he had to be sold to Werder Bremen, where he played 64 times between then and 1996. He had short spells at 1. FC Köln and Reggiana.

International career 
Beiersdorfer played one game for the Germany national team, in May 1991. It was a Euro 1992 qualifier against Belgium.

Coaching career 
After retiring Beiersdorfer took a course in business management, and proceeded to become the general manager of Hamburger SV, before being released on 24 June 2009. On 1 January 2010. he became sport director of FC Red Bull Salzburg, replacing Heinz Hochhauser. On 8 April 2011, he parted company with Salzburg by mutual consent after poor record in the season.

Honours 
Hamburger SV
 DFB-Pokal: 1986–87

Werder Bremen
 Bundesliga: 1992–93
 DFB-Pokal: 1993–94
 DFL-Supercup: 1993, 1994

References

External links 
 
 

1963 births
Living people
Sportspeople from Fürth
German footballers
Association football defenders
Germany international footballers
Germany under-21 international footballers
SpVgg Greuther Fürth players
Hamburger SV players
SV Werder Bremen players
1. FC Köln players
A.C. Reggiana 1919 players
Bundesliga players
Serie A players
German expatriate footballers
German expatriate sportspeople in Italy
Expatriate footballers in Italy
Footballers from Bavaria
West German footballers